Keita is a surname. The Malian family name is normally written Keïta, sometimes Kéita. Kéïta is a hypercorrection. In reference to non-modern figures, or in anglophone countries such as The Gambia and Liberia the tréma ( ¨ ) or acute accent ( ´ )  is not used. Notable people with the surname include:

Politics 
 Aoua Kéita (1912–1980), Malian independence activist and writer
 Bintou Keita (born 1958), UN Diplomat
 Ibrahim Boubacar Keïta (1945–2022), Malian politician
 Karim Keïta (born 1979), Malian politician, son of the above
 Modibo Keïta (1915–1977), first President of Mali
 Modibo Keita (1942–2021), Malian politician and former Prime Minister
 Sundiata Keita (c. 1217 – c. 1255), founder of the Mali Empire
 Keita dynasty, ruling dynasty of the Mali Empire

Entertainment 
 Balla Moussa Keïta (1934–2001), Malian actor and comedian
 Mamady Keïta (1950–2021), Guinean master drummer
 Mamani Keïta (born 1965), Malian singer
 Salif Keita (born 1949), Malian singer-songwriter
 Seckou Keita (born 1978), Senegalese musician
 Seydou Keïta (1921–2001), Malian self-taught portrait photographer

Sport 
 Abdoulaye Keita, Guinean footballer and coach
 Abdoulaye Khouma Keita (born 1978), Senegalese footballer
 Abdul Kader Keïta (born 1981), Ivorian footballer
Adama Kéïta (born 1990), Malian footballer
 Alhassane Keita (born 1983), Guinean footballer
 Alphousseyni Keita (born 1985), Malian footballer
 Brima Keita, Sierra Leonean football manager
 Cheick Keita (born 1996), Malian footballer
 Daba Modibo Keïta (born 1981), Malian Olympic taekwondo athlete
 Fadel Keïta (born 1977), Ivorian footballer
 Fantamady Keita (born 1949), Malian footballer
 Ibrahima Keita (born 1985), Ivorian footballer
 Idrissa Keita (born 1977), Ivorian footballer
 Ismaël Keïta (born 1990), Malian footballer
 Karounga Keita (born 1941), Malian footballer, coach and official
 Ladji Keita, (born 1983), Senegalese footballer
 Mohamed Keita (footballer) (born 1991), Guinean footballer
 Muhamed Keita (born 1990), Norwegian footballer
 Naby Keïta (born 1995), Guinean footballer
 Naman Keïta (born 1978), French Olympic track and field athlete
 Nantenin Keita (born 1984), French Paralympic athlete
 Salif Keïta (born 1946), former Malian footballer
 Salif Keita (born 1975), Senegalese footballer
 Sega Keita (born 1992), Senegalese footballer
 Sekou Keita (born 1979), Liberian former footballer
 Seydou Keita (born 1980), Malian footballer
 Sidi Yaya Keita (born 1985), Malian footballer
 Souleymane Keïta (born 1986), Malian footballer
 Souleymane Keita (born 1987), Senegalese footballer

Mandinka surnames